Forbes is a town in the Central West region of New South Wales, Australia, located on the Newell Highway between Parkes and West Wyalong. Forbes is probably named after Sir Francis Forbes, first Chief Justice of NSW.

The district is a cropping area where wheat and similar crops are grown. Nearby towns and villages include Calarie, Parkes, Bedgerebong, Bundabarrah, Corradgery, Daroobalgie, Eugowra, Ooma North and Paytens Bridge. Forbes is subject to a pattern of flooding, generally occurring to a significant level once every seven years, including 2016 and 2022.

History
The area was home to the Wiradjuri people before non-indigenous settlement. John Oxley passed through in 1817 during one of the first inland expeditions. Oxley named the site Camp Hill. He was unimpressed with the clay soil, poor timber and swamps and he concluded, it is impossible to imagine a worse country. The first settlers moved into the district in 1834.

Gold was discovered by Harry Stephan, also known as "German Harry", in June 1861. Initially about 30,000 people moved to the goldfields, but by 1863 this had declined to about 3,500 because of the difficult mining conditions.

The goldfields were originally named "Black Ridge", and the name "Forbes" celebrating Sir Francis Forbes was declared from Sydney as the result of a possible government administrative error. It is said that the name was meant for the town now known as "Hill End" between Orange and Mudgee,  where gold was discovered around a similar time. Gold was initially found in the area known as Halpin's Flat. The Albion Hotel, once a Cobb and Co. stage coach stop, had tunnels situated underneath which were used during the gold rush to convey gold and money to and from the banks to minimise the chance of theft. The Albion Hotel burnt down on 10 February 2009, losing years worth of history and memorabilia.

Hall and his gang were famous for stealing  of gold and £3,700 from the nearby town of Eugowra in 1862. He is buried in Forbes Cemetery.

Kate Kelly, the sister of bushranger Ned Kelly, lived in the town. She drowned in Lake Forbes while saving an Aboriginal child during a flood in 1898 and was found in a lagoon of the Lachlan River, just outside Forbes. She is buried in Forbes Cemetery.

Heritage listings 
Forbes has a number of heritage-listed sites, including:
 Billabong Creek, Ben Halls Road: Ben Hall's Death Site
 Forbes Cemetery, Bogan Gate Road: Grave of Ben Hall
 118 Lachlan Street: Forbes Post Office
 Parkes-Stockinbingal railway: Forbes railway station

Population
According to the 2016 census of Population, there were 8,432 people in Forbes.
 Aboriginal and Torres Strait Islander people made up 12.1% of the population. 
 86.2% of people were born in Australia and 89.1% of people spoke only English at home. 
 The most common responses for religion were Catholic 35.1%, Anglican 24.7% and No Religion 15.4%.

Transport
The Stockinbingal–Parkes railway line passes through Forbes. Passenger trains operated to Forbes until 1983.
Forbes lies at or near the confluence of the Newell Highway, the Lachlan Valley Way and Henry Lawson Way.

Education
Forbes Shire has four public primary schools: Forbes Primary School, Forbes North Primary School, Corinella Public School and Bedgerebong Public School.  There is one Catholic primary school, St Laurence's Primary School.

Forbes High School, a public school, is located to the north of town.

Red Bend Catholic College at Forbes is a co-educational secondary school, with the school located at the site of the former Marist Brothers' College, on the banks of the Lachlan River.

Local tertiary institutions are the Forbes College of Technical and Further Education (TAFE) and the Forbes Conservatorium.

Sport
The Forbes Camel Races have been held annually since 2001 on Good Friday at the Forbes Racecourse.

Climate
Forbes lies in the transitional zones of the semi-arid climate (BSh) and humid subtropical climates (Cfa), with relatively large temperature variation between seasons, and moderate rainfall spread evenly throughout the year.

It features 133.2 clear days annually.

Floods

Forbes' most recent major flood was in late September 2016 after heavy rain fell on much of inland NSW; as the Bureau of Meteorology declared 2016 as the third-wettest winter on record. Unseasonal heavy rainfall in most of the state, centred on the catchment area of the upper Lachlan during autumn and winter 2016, resulted in Wyangala Dam water storage levels increasing from 38 per cent to 90 per cent. By early August, the Bureau of Meteorology had issued flood warnings for the Orara, Macquarie, Bogan and Lachlan rivers. Forbes was declared a natural disaster zone after flash flooding occurred, resulting in some residents being without homes. Back up support was provided by the State Emergency Service and the Australian Defence Force.

Newspapers 
There are two local newspapers servicing Forbes.
 The Forbes Advocate is owned by Fairfax Media.
 The Forbes Phoenix is a free weekly paper that is published on Fridays. It is part of the independently owned Phoenix Group of papers.

Notable residents
Phil Adams, former Olympian and Commonwealth Games (record) medal holder in sport shooting
Chris Anderson, who played for and coached the Australian rugby league team, attended Red Bend Catholic College in Forbes
 Janet Dawson, Australian artist, spent childhood years in Forbes
Sir Hugh Robert Denison, tobacco manufacturer, newspaper proprietor and philanthropist, was born in Forbes in 1865
 Richard Dixon, former national president of the Communist Party of Australia, was born in Forbes in 1905
 Malcolm Johnston - Australian Racing Hall of Fame jockey
 Eve Langley, New Zealand-famed novelist, was born in Forbes in 1904
 Celia Pavey, known professionally as Vera Blue, is an Australian singer-songwriter who was born in Forbes January 1994
Cec Pepper (1916-1993), first-class cricketer, was born in Forbes
 Charlie Staines, rugby league player for the Wests Tigers, born in Forbes.
 Carolyn Simpson, a judge of the Supreme Court of New South Wales; Member of the first all-female bench to sit in an Australian court
 Carmel Tebbutt, a former Deputy Premier of New South Wales, was born and raised in Forbes
 Damian Kennedy former western suburbs magpies and Canberra Raiders player

References

External links
Forbes - VisitNSW

 
Towns in New South Wales
Towns in the Central West (New South Wales)
Newell Highway
1861 establishments in Australia
Forbes Shire
Mining towns in New South Wales